Pentacitrotus vulneratus is a species of moth of the family Tortricidae. It is found in China and India (Assam, Punjab).

The wingspan is 23–25 mm. The forewings are purple black with a greenish sheen and bright orange, crimson-orange or crimson markings, edged at a short distance with shining leaden-greenish and violet lines. The hindwings are yellowish orange or reddish orange with a brownish-black band.

References

Moths described in 1881
Ceracini